Yellow Dog was a prominent publisher of bootlegs by many prominent artists. The label released series such as "Unsurpassed Masters" (outtakes by many artists, including the Beatles and the Beach Boys) and "Day By Day" (the complete Beatles' "Get Back" sessions). This label has in turn been copied by many other bootleg labels, such as Kiss The Stone and Chapter One. Yellow Dog was shut down in Europe in 2002, but continued to run in Japan until 2006.

Sublabels
Yellow Dog also maintained many sublabels:
 Black Dog Records - Released titles similar to those released on Yellow Dog, lasted from 1992 to 2006
 Cool Romeo - Released titles by Elvis Presley, only used in 2000
 Dandelion - Released titles by the Rolling Stones and Bob Dylan, lasted from 1998 to 2001
 Dumb Angel - Released titles like the Beach Boys, only used in 2000
 Green Cat - Only released one CD in 2000
 Hard Rain - Released a few titles, lasted from 1995 to 2000
 Library Product - Mainly released Paul McCartney titles, only used in 2000
 Midnight Beat - Primarily released Jimi Hendrix titles, but released many other titles as well, lasted from 1992 to 2002
 Mistral Music - Released various titles from 1991 to 1994
 Moonlight - Released titles by a various number of artists, lasted from 1990 to 1996
 Orange - Released many titles in 2000
 Rattle Snake - Released titles by the Rolling Stones and Bob Dylan. This label is still active
 Sea Of Tunes - Released titles by the Beach Boys, lasted from 1997 to 2007
 Sidewalk - Released titles by the Beatles and other artists in 2000
 Strawberry Records - Released titles by the Beatles, lasted from 1988 to 2002
 Yellow Cat Records - Released titles by a variety of artists, lasted from 1993 to 2005

External links
List of records by Yellow Dog

References 

The Beatles bootleg recordings
Bootleggers
Japanese companies established in 1989
2006 disestablishments in Japan
Japanese companies disestablished in 2006
Record labels established in 1989